Pietro Cossa (25 January 1830 – 30 August 1881) was an Italian dramatist.

Life
Cossa was born at Rome, and claimed descent from the family of Antipope John XXIII.

He manifested an independent spirit from his youth, and was expelled from a Jesuit school on the double charge of indocility and patriotism. After fighting for the Roman Republic in 1849, he emigrated to South America. However, failing to establish himself he returned to Italy, and lived precariously as a literary man until 1870, when his reputation was established by the unexpected success of his first acted tragedy, Nero.

From this time to his death Cossa continued to produce a play a year, usually upon some classical subject. Cleopatra, Messalina, Julian, enjoyed great popularity, and his dramas on subjects derived from Italian history, Rienzi and The Borgias, were also successful. Plautus, a comedy, was preferred by the author himself, and is more original. Incidental music for some of his plays was written by celebrated Italian composers, notably Luigi Mancinelli.

The entry for Cossa in the 1911 Encyclopedia Britannica evaluated his style as follows:

Cossa died at Livorno in 1881. His collected Teatro poetico was published in 1887.

References

Attribution

External links
Page at Dizionario Biografico degli Italiani 
 

1830 births
1880 deaths
Writers from Rome
Italian male dramatists and playwrights
19th-century Italian dramatists and playwrights
19th-century Italian male writers